John Newsome may refer to:
John P. Newsome (1893–1961), politician in the U.S. state of Alabama
John R. Newsome (fl. 2000s), politician in the U.S. state of Colorado

See also
John Newsom, American painter
Jon Newsome, English footballer